İbrahim İlker Aksum (born 23 May 1971) is a Turkish actor. He has appeared in more than twenty popular series and films since 1999. His breakthrough roles are in popular series "Yabancı Damat", "Canım Ailem" "Çarli", "Olacak O Kadar", "Karayılan". He starred alongside Tuba Büyüküstün in  20 Dakika which has a nomination for the 42nd International Emmy Award for Best Actress.

Filmography

Series
 Başım Belada: (2023)
 Kaderimin Oyunu:  (2021)
 Eşkıya Dünyaya Hükümdar Olmaz:  (2021)
 Ramo: (2020–2021) (Hasan)
 Diriliş Ertuğrul (2018) - Dragos
 Mehmetçik Kut'ül Amare (2018) - Cox
 Poyraz Karayel (2016–2017) - Çınar Sayguner
 Seddülbahir 32 Saat: Yasin Uslu - (2016) - Ramiz
 Yeşil Deniz - (2015–2016)
 Ne Diyosuun (Ali Kemal) Başrol oyuncusu - (2014) 
 Tatar Ramazan: Cevdet Mercan - (2013)
 20 Dakika: Ali Bilgin - (2013) - Ali Halaskar
 Kötü Yol: Nisan Akman - (2012) - Reşat
 Bizim Yenge: Aydın Bulut - (2011) - Bahri
 Sen de Gitme: Türkan Derya - (2011) - Doktor Yahya Turan
 Muhteşem Yüzyıl: Taylan Biraderler - (2011) - Kaptan-ı Derya Cafer Ağa (Konuk Oyuncu)
 Canım Ailem: Türkan Derya - (2008-2010) - Halim
 Karayılan: Taylan Biraderler - (2007) - Yüzbaşı Laroş
 Yabancı Damat: Taylan Biraderler - (2004-2007) - Ruşen Demir
 Aşk Olsun: Yasemin Türkmenli - (2003) - Yıldırım
 Çarli İş Başında: Taylan Biraderler - (2000) - Afakan
 Çarli: Taylan Biraderler - (1998) - Afakan
 Olacak O Kadar : Levent Kırca - (1997) - İlker

Films
 Yangın Günleri: Independenta
 Nefes: Yer Eksi İki: (2023) Ufuk
 Demir Kadın: Neslican: (2023)
 Müjdemi İsterim: (2022)
 Azizler: (2021)
 7. Koğuştaki Mucize: (2019) Askorozlu
 Hedefim Sensin (2018) Yarım Hasan 
 Her Şey Seninle Güzel (2018)
 Buyur Bi'De Burdan Bak (2016, 2018)
 Aşk Olsun (Başrol oyuncusu) - (2015)
 Kadim Dostum (Başrol oyuncusu)  - (2014)
 Mutlu Aile Defteri: Nihat Durak - (2013) - Kudret Taşyumruk
 Bizim Büyük Çaresizliğimiz: Seyfi Teoman - (2011) - Ender
 Vavien: Taylan Biraderler - (2009) - Televizyoncu Sabri
 Ejder Kapanı: Uğur Yücel - (2009) - Doktor
 Güz Sancısı: Tomris Giritlioğlu - (2008) - İsmet
 Küçük Kıyamet: Taylan Biraderler - (2006) - Ali 
 Beşik Kertmesi: Taylan Biraderler - (2002) - Enis Büyütücü
 Biz Size Aşık Olduk: Türkan Derya - (2002) - Sinan
 Baykuşların Saltanatı: Tülay Eratalay - (2000)
 5 Maymun Çetesi: Taylan Biraderler - (1999) - Amerikan

References

External links 

1971 births
Living people
Turkish male film actors
People from Isparta